A constitutional referendum was held in Morocco on 23 May 1980. The referendum asked whether voters approved of changes to article 21 of the 1972 constitution, which concerned the Regency Council, and reduced the age of majority for the King from 18 to 16. The changes were approved by 99.6% of voters, with a 96.8% turnout. A second referendum was held a week later on articles 43 and 95.

Results

References

1980 referendums
Referendums in Morocco
1980 in Morocco
Constitutional referendums in Morocco